Unai Bustinza Martínez (born 2 February 1992) is a Spanish professional footballer who plays for Málaga CF as a right-back.

Club career

Athletic Bilbao
Born in Bilbao, Biscay, Bustinza joined Athletic Bilbao's prolific youth system in 2002, aged ten. He made his debut as a senior with the farm team in the 2010–11 season, in Tercera División.

In May 2011, Bustinza was promoted to the reserves in the Segunda División B. He appeared regularly for them the following campaigns, scoring a career-best five goals in 2012–13.

On 15 July 2014, Bustinza was promoted to the Basques' main squad in La Liga. He made his debut in the competition on 25 August, coming on as a late substitute in a 1–0 away win over UD Almería.

Bustinza was handed his first start for the Lions on 2 May 2015, being sent off in the 93rd minute of the 0–0 draw with Atlético Madrid for two bookable offences. Late in the month, he played the full 90 minutes in the final of the Copa del Rey against FC Barcelona, a 3–1 loss.

Leganés
On 22 July 2015, Bustinza was loaned to Segunda División club CD Leganés in a season-long deal. The following 18 July, after achieving top-flight promotion, he signed a permanent three-year contract after cutting ties with Athletic.

Málaga
On 2 July 2022, free agent Bustinza joined Málaga CF on a three-year deal.

International career
Bustinza made his debut for the unofficial Basque Country national team in May 2019, in a 0–0 draw away to Panama for which a small, youthful and inexperienced squad was selected.

References

External links

1992 births
Living people
Spanish footballers
Footballers from Bilbao
Association football defenders
La Liga players
Segunda División players
Segunda División B players
Tercera División players
CD Basconia footballers
Bilbao Athletic footballers
Athletic Bilbao footballers
CD Leganés players
Málaga CF players
Basque Country international footballers